Salem Amer Al-Badri (birth name Moses Chirchir; born 12 December 1985 in Kenya) is a retired middle-distance runner who competed internationally for Qatar mostly in the 800 metres event. He jointly holds the Asian record in the rarely contested 4 × 800 metres relay.

His 800 metres personal bests are 1:45.45 seconds outdoors and 1:50.93 indoors, both set in 2006.

Competition record

References

1985 births
Living people
Qatari male middle-distance runners
Athletes (track and field) at the 2002 Asian Games
Athletes (track and field) at the 2006 Asian Games
Kenyan emigrants to Qatar
Naturalised citizens of Qatar
Qatari people of Kenyan descent
Asian Games competitors for Qatar